is a railway station on the Aizu Railway Aizu Line in the town of Minamiaizu, Minamiaizu District, Fukushima Prefecture, Japan, operated by the Aizu Railway.

Lines

Station layout
Aizu-Nagano Station has a single side platform serving a single bi-directional track. The station is unattended.

Adjacent stations

History
Aizu-Nagano Station opened on December 27, 1934.

Surrounding area
Nagano Post Office

See also
 List of railway stations in Japan

External links

 Aizu Railway Station information 

Railway stations in Fukushima Prefecture
Aizu Line
Railway stations in Japan opened in 1934
Minamiaizu, Fukushima